Emmanuel Ayaah Okine (born 17 December 1991), simply known as Emmanuel Okine, is a Ghanaian footballer who plays as a centre defender. He is currently a free agent.

Emmanuel previously played for Great Olympics in the Ghana Premier League.

In November 2022, Okine got a 3.5 year prison sentence in Sweden due to financial fraud on a dating site. Okine received almost 3.5 million from a Swedish man who later on committed suicide.

References

External links
 Emmanuel Okine Profile at IMScouting
 
 

1991 births
Living people
Association football central defenders
Ghanaian footballers
Ghanaian expatriate footballers
Ghana international footballers
Kelantan FA players
Kuala Lumpur City F.C. players
FC Rosengård 1917 players
Mjällby AIF players
Landskrona BoIS players
FK Mjølner players
Ettan Fotboll players
Norwegian Second Division players
Expatriate footballers in Sweden